Quest of the Delta Knights is a 1993 fantasy/adventure sword and sorcery film that was featured in a September 1998 episode of Mystery Science Theater 3000. It is one of only a few movies shown on MST3K that was made in the 1990s.

Plot 
The plot revolves around a young boy named Travis (nicknamed "Tee") who learns from his master that he is the key to saving the world from an evil plot. Tee joins the secret organization of the Delta Knights and embarks on a quest to attempt to recover the lost treasures inside the fabled Lost Storehouse of Archimedes. The plot is markedly similar to that of Robert Heinlein's Citizen of the Galaxy, including its essentially identical setup of a young slave boy—who is really the lost heir of a powerful family—being bought for a pittance by a seeming beggar, who is himself really a spy, and who suspects the boy's true identity.

Anachronisms
The film displays extreme confusion with regard to setting, both in terms of time period and location. The story seems to take place in medieval England, although a number of plot elements contradict this. Vultare's henchmen wear headgear strongly resembling (stereotypical) Viking helmets. Baydool states that they are in the Dark Ages, yet firearms are inexplicably used. Leonardo da Vinci, a figure from Renaissance Italy, appears as a major character in the plot. Finally, Leonardo and Tee are searching for the lost storehouse of Archimedes, a figure from ancient Syracuse, Sicily, whose storehouse one might reasonably think unlikely to be found in England. A document held by Archimedes seen in a flashback is also clearly held together by staples.

These anachronisms served as fodder for the cast of Mystery Science Theater 3000: Mike Nelson riffing "Sultans! Pirates! After them!" as the protagonists are fleeing from questionably dressed guards, Tom Servo has a choir that sings about the Delta Knights who "live in Europe somewhere", and Leonardo da Vinci (played by Bill Corbett) ridicules the "bad movie" and pointing out that the film's depiction of him is a "mook" who is nothing like him.

Filming locations
A large portion of this movie was filmed at the Renaissance Pleasure Faire in Black Point, Novato, California. Performers from the Faire were employed as extras in various scenes throughout. Exterior scenes of Archimedes' storehouse were filmed at the Palace of Fine Arts, San Francisco, California. Exterior scenes of the prison were filmed at Petaluma Adobe State Historic Park, Petaluma, California. Some interior scenes of the Mannerjay's palace were filmed at the Scottish Rite Temple, Oakland, California.

Cast 
 David Warner - Baydool / Lord Vultare / Narrator
 Corbin Allred - Tee
 Olivia Hussey - The Mannerjay
 David Kriegel - Leonardo
 Brigid Brannagh - Thena
 Sarah Douglas - Madam Maaydeed
 Richard Kind - Wamthool

Production
David Warner was originally intended to play one character in the movie but suggested that he could play two roles for the same cost.

Reception
Jim Craddock, author of VideoHound's Golden Movie Retriever, gave the movie two and half stars.

In a 2017 interview with The A.V. Club, David Warner expressed his enjoyment in being in Quest of the Delta Knights, followed by his amusement at the film being featured on Mystery Science Theater 3000.

References

External links
 
 

1993 films
1990s action adventure films
1990s fantasy adventure films
American fantasy adventure films
American sword and sorcery films
Cultural depictions of Leonardo da Vinci
1990s English-language films
1990s American films